Katz is a common German and Ashkenazi surname.

Germans with the last name Katz may originate in the Rhine River region of Germany, where the Katz Castle is located.

It has been used since the seventeenth century, or perhaps somewhat earlier, as an epithet of the descendants of Aaron. The collocation is most likely derived from Melchizedek ("king of righteousness"), who is called "the priest (kohen) of the most high God" (Genesis xiv. 18), or perhaps from Psalm cxxxii. 9: "Let thy priests be clothed with righteousness (tzedeq)". The use of the abbreviated and Germanicized Katz likely coincided with the imposition of German names on Jews in Germany in the 18th or 19th century.

If the reading is correct, this abbreviation occurs on a tombstone, dated 1536, in the cemetery of Prague.  It is found also on a tombstone of the year 1618 in Frankfurt, in the books of the Soncino family of Prague of the seventeenth century, and in one of the prefaces to Shabbethai ben Meïr ha-Kohen's notes on the Choshen Mishpat (Amsterdam, 1663).

People
 Ada Katz (born 1928), American artist's model
 Albert Katz (1858–1923), writer
 Alex Katz (born 1927), American artist
 Alex Katz (baseball) (born 1994), American baseball player
 Allan Katz (born 1941), American comedy writer
 Allan J. Katz (born 1947), American ambassador to Portugal
 Amir Katz (born 1973), Israeli-born musician
 Andrew Katz, drummer of Car Seat Headrest 
 Andy Katz (born 1968), American college basketball journalist
 Sir Bernard Katz (1911–2003), German-born British biophysicist
 Boris Katz (born 1947), American computer scientist
 Burt Katz (1937–2016), American restaurateur
 Daniel Katz (psychologist) (1903–1998), American psychologist 
 Daniel Katz (politician) (born 1961), Argentine politician and former mayor of Mar del Plata, Argentina
 Danny Katz (columnist), Australian columnist and author
 Daryl Katz, Canadian drug store owner, owner of Edmonton Oilers
 David Katz (author), British music historian and journalist
 Dovid Katz, Lithuanian-American Yiddishist and academic
 Elias Katz, Finnish 3,000-meter team steeplechase Olympic champion
 Elie Katz, former mayor of Teaneck, New Jersey, United States
 Elihu Katz, American sociologist
 Emmanuel Mané-Katz, Ukraine-born Israeli artist
 Erez Katz (born 1980), Israeli basketball player
 Erich Katz (1900–1973), German-born musicologist and Jewish refugee
 Ethan Katz (born 1983), American assistant pitching coach for the San Francisco Giants
 Gary Katz, American music producer
 Haim Katz, Israeli politician
 Harold Katz, American entrepreneur
 Harold A. Katz (1921–2012), American lawyer and politician
 Ian Katz, British journalist (born in South Africa)
 Israel Katz, Israeli politician
 Jackson Katz, creator of gender violence prevention and education program Mentors in Violence Prevention
 Jacob Katz, Israeli historian
 Jane Katz, competitive swimmer and author of successful swimming books
 Jane Lobman Katz (1931–1986), American activist
 Jay Katz (disambiguation), name/pseudonym for several people
 Jeff Katz, American film producer and comic book author
 Jeffrey Owen Katz, American scientist
 Jeffry Katz, American music producer
 Jerrold Katz, American philosopher and linguist
 Joanne Katz, American professor
 Joette Katz (born 1953), American attorney
 Jon Katz (born 1947), American journalist and writer
 Jonathan Katz (born 1946), American comedian, actor, and voice actor
 Jonathan David Katz (born 1958), American professor
 Jonathan Ned Katz (born 1938), historian of LGBT American history
 Joseph Katz (disambiguation)
 Judah Katz, Canadian actor
 Louise Katz, Australian writer of fantasy and young adult fiction
 Leo Katz, jurist
 Leo Katz (1914–1976), American statistician
  (1892–1954), Austrian writer
 Leon Katz (born 1919), professor emeritus of drama at Yale University
 Leon Katz (1909–2004), Canadian physicist
 Liz Katz, American cosplayer and actress whose credits include Guest House and Borderlands 3 
 Martin Katz (disambiguation)
 Maxim Katz, Russian politician and activist
 Mickey Katz, American comedian and musician
 Mike Katz, American bodybuilder
 Mikhail Katz, Israeli mathematician and professor
 Miriam Katz (born 1931), birth name of Miriam Zohar, Israeli actress
 Nathan Katz (professor), American professor
 Nathan Katz (poet), Alsatian poet
 Nets Katz, mathematician
 Nicholas Katz, American mathematician
 Omri Katz, American-Israeli actor
 Otto Katz, agent of the Soviet Union
 Paul Katz, American cellist
 Phil Katz, American computer programmer
 Phoebe Cates (born Phoebe Belle Katz), American actress
 Ralph Katz, American bridge player
 Randy H. Katz, UC Berkeley professor
 Raphael Katz, American politician
 Richard H. Katz, American bridge player
 Robert Katz (1933–2010), American novelist, screenwriter, and non-fiction author
 Ronald A. Katz, inventor
 Ron Katz (born 1985), Israeli politician
 Rudolf Katz (1895-1961), German judge and politician
 Ryan Katz (born 1976), American professional wrestler billed as "GQ Money"
 Sam Katz, mayor of Winnipeg, Manitoba
 Samuel Katz (disambiguation)
 Sandor Katz (born 1962), American DIY writer and food activist
 Sheldon Katz (born 1956), American mathematician
 Shemuel Katz (1926–2010), Israeli artist
 Sidney A. Katz, mayor of Gaithersburg, Maryland
 Simon Katz, English songwriter and multi-instrumentalist
 Steve Katz (disambiguation), several people
Steve Katz (writer) (1935–2019), American writer
Steve Katz (musician) (born 1945), American musician
Steven T. Katz (born 1944), Jewish philosopher
Steven A. Katz (born 1959), writer of the screenplay Shadow of the Vampire
Steve Katz (politician) (born 1953), veterinarian and member of the New York State Assembly
Stephen Katz (writer) (1946–2005), American teacher and screenwriter
Stephen Katz (real name Matthew Angerer), traveling companion of travel writer Bill Bryson
Stephen M. Katz (cinematographer)
 Sky Katz, American rapper and actress
 Tamar Katz, Israeli figure skater living in the United States
 Tuvia Katz (born 1936), Israeli artist
 Vera Katz (1933–2017), American politician
 Welwyn Wilton Katz, Canadian children's author
 William Loren Katz (1927–2019), American historian, specializing in African American history
 Yossi Katz, Israeli politician
 Yossi Katz (geographer), Israeli professor in political geography
 Zebra Katz, American rapper

See also 
 Katz (disambiguation)
 Kutz (disambiguation)
 Katzmann, Katzman
 Katz forms: Kaz (KAẒ), Catz, Kats, Cats

References 

German-language surnames
Ashkenazi surnames
Kohenitic surnames
Yiddish-language surnames
Surnames from nicknames
de:Katz
it:Katz
he:כץ